Întregalde is a commune located in Alba County, Transylvania, Romania. It is composed of eleven villages: Dealu Geoagiului (Havasgyógy), Ghioncani, Iliești, Întregalde, Ivăniș, Mărinești, Modolești, Necrilești (Nekrilesti), Popești (Popesti), Sfârcea (Szfirecsea) and Tecșești (Teksesty).

Geography
It lies at the foot of the Trascău Mountains, in the Apuseni mountain range. The area is full of wild animals, including wolves, brown bears, and wild boars.

The river Galda flows through the villages of Ghioncani and Ivăniș. Its right tributary, the Găldița, flows through Sfârcea and Necrilești, joining the Galda  from the center of Întregalde, while its left tributary, the Ghilcer, flows through  Modolești.

The commune has the following neighbors: to the northwest, Mogoș commune; to the north, Râmeț commune; to the east, Stremț and Galda de Jos communes; to the southeast, Ighiu commune; to the south, Meteș commune; and to the southwest, the town of Zlatna. Întregalde is traversed by county road DJ107K, which runs from Mogoș to Galda de Jos, where it connects to European route E81.

History
The locality was first attested in 1525, under the name of Galda Românească, during the time when the Voivode of Transylvania was John Zápolya, who in 1526 became King of Hungary. The oldest village is Dealu Geoagiului, documented since 1413, as Alter Gyor Valaharis, or the Other Romanian Geoagiu. 

The name Întregalde (literally, "In Between the Galdas") is said to come from the fact that the first houses were built near the confluence of the two rivers running through town, Galda and Găldița (or, "Little Galda").

Demographics
According to the census from 2011 there was a total population of 577 people living in this commune (down from 2,385 in 1941 and 877 in 2002), of which 94.8% are ethnic Romanians. Furthermore, 92.2% are Orthodox and 1.39% are Seventh-day Adventists.

In recent years, the population of the commune has been declining and aging, with an average age of about 60. Some 60 inhabitants work outside the country. As of 2012, one of the villages, Mărinești, had a single dweller, a man in his 80s.

Tourist attractions
 The  (from 1742)
 The  (from 1774)
 The , in Sfârcea
 The  nature reserve and the 
 The , on the road between Întregalde and Necrilești villages
 The , along the Cetii Valley, on the road to Stremț
 The

References

External links

Communes in Alba County
Localities in Transylvania